The 1875 Columbia football team represented Columbia University in the 1875 college football season. The team finished with a 4–1–1 record and was retroactively named co-national champion by Parke H. Davis. They outscored their opponents 13–10 (scoring used then differed from today's system).

Schedule

References

Columbia
Columbia Lions football seasons
College football national champions
Columbia football